This is a list of Japanese natural gas companies.

Major suppliers:
Tokyo Gas
Osaka Gas
Toho Gas
Saibu Gas

Semi-major suppliers:
Shizuoka Gas
Hokkaido Gas
Hiroshima Gas
Hokuriku Gas
Keiyo Gas
Chubu Gas
Otaki Gas
Shin-nihon Gas
Higashi-nihon Gas

See also
List of public utilities

Japan natural gas
 
Natural Gas
Japan natural gas